Sitti Live! is a live album by Filipino singer Sitti. It was released by Warner Music Philippines on September 15, 2006. The concert was recorded live at the Ortigas Park in Pasig, Metro Manila.

Track listing
 One Note Samba (running time 2:08)
 Wave (3:03)
 Samba Song (2:47)
 Água de Beber (4:09)
 Birimbao (4:12)
 Fever (5:26)
 Para sa Akin  (3:16)
Literal English translation of title: "For Me"
 Tattooed on My Mind (4:21)
 Hey Look at the Sun (4:26)
 I Didn't Know I Was Looking For Love (4:13)
 Waters of March (4:16)
 Ikaw Pa Rin (3:59)
Literal English translation of title: "Still You"
 For Your Eyes Only (3:34)
 Voçe Abuso (3:10)
 Lança Perfume (3:24)
 País Tropical (5:08)
 Mas que Nada – 8:36
 Just the Two of Us – 3:19

Personnel
Sitti Navarro - vocals
Erskine Basilio - nylon guitar
Jerome Rico - guitar on "One Note Samba"
Steven Mora - drums
Lakshmi Ramirez - double bass
Audrey Cruz - percussion
Archie Lacorte - saxophone
Mark Laccay - recording of the album
Dante Tanedo - mixing
Frey Zambrano - production coordinator
Rey Cortez - album cover layout
Kristine Soguilon - photography
Mari Arquiza - photography
Jim Baluyut - executive production
Neil Gregorio - album production, A&R, mastering and sequencing

References

2006 live albums
Live Latin jazz albums
Sitti albums
Warner Music Philippines albums